Palm Island Airport  is an airport in Palm Island, on Great Palm Island, Queensland, Australia.

Airlines and destinations

Aerial photos and maps 
 (requires Javascript)

See also 
 Solomon Dam
 List of airports in Queensland

References 

Airports in Queensland